Utricularia nephrophylla is a small to medium-sized lithophytic carnivorous plant that belongs to the genus Utricularia. U. nephrophylla is endemic to Brazil. It was originally published and described by Ludwig Benjamin in 1847. It flowers year-round.

See also 
 List of Utricularia species

References 

Carnivorous plants of South America
Flora of Brazil
nephrophylla